Molluscum dermatitis represents a unique form of id reaction, in which patients may present with localized or widespread eczema surrounding scattered lesions of molluscum contagiosum.

See also
Skin lesion

References

 
Eczema